Gibraltar sent 1 athlete to the 1978 European Athletics Championships which took place 29 August–3 September 1978 in Prague. Gibraltar won no medals at the Championships.

References 

Nations at the 1978 European Athletics Championships
Gibraltar at the European Athletics Championships
1978 in Gibraltar